American Crime Story is an American anthology true crime television series developed by Scott Alexander and Larry Karaszewski, who are also executive producers, alongside Brad Falchuk, Nina Jacobson, Ryan Murphy, and Brad Simpson. The series is the second installment in the American Story media franchise, following American Horror Story. Each season is presented as a self-contained miniseries and is independent of the events in other seasons. Alexander and Karaszewski did not return after the first season, but retain executive-producer credits. In the United States, the series is broadcast on FX. In January 2023, the series was renewed for a fourth season.
The fourth season will premiere in 2024. 

The first season, subtitled The People v. O. J. Simpson, chronicled the murder trial of O. J. Simpson, and was based on the book The Run of His Life: The People v. O. J. Simpson by Jeffrey Toobin. It premiered on February 2, 2016. The second season, subtitled The Assassination of Gianni Versace, chronicled the murder of designer Gianni Versace by spree-killer Andrew Cunanan, and based on the book Vulgar Favors by Maureen Orth. It premiered on January 17, 2018, and concluded on March 21, 2018. The third season, subtitled Impeachment, chronicles the Clinton–Lewinsky scandal, and is based on the book A Vast Conspiracy: The Real Story of the Sex Scandal That Nearly Brought Down a President, also by Toobin. It premiered on September 7, 2021.

A season based on the aftermath of Hurricane Katrina had been in development, but in February 2019 FX announced that the idea had been abandoned. A potential fourth season, tentatively titled Studio 54, which would focus on the rise and fall of Studio 54 owners Steve Rubell and Ian Schrager, is in development.

Seasons

Overview

The People v. O. J. Simpson (2016)
 
Based on Jeffrey Toobin's The Run of His Life: The People v. O. J. Simpson, the season explores the O. J. Simpson (Cuba Gooding Jr.) murder case as well as the combination of prosecution confidence, defense wiliness, and the Los Angeles Police Department's history with the city's African-American community that gave a jury what it needed: reasonable doubt.

The season also stars Sterling K. Brown as Christopher Darden, Kenneth Choi as Lance Ito, Christian Clemenson as Bill Hodgman, Bruce Greenwood as Gil Garcetti, Nathan Lane as F. Lee Bailey, Sarah Paulson as Marcia Clark, David Schwimmer as Robert Kardashian, John Travolta as Robert Shapiro, and Courtney B. Vance as Johnnie Cochran.

The Assassination of Gianni Versace (2018)
 
Based on Maureen Orth's Vulgar Favors: Andrew Cunanan, Gianni Versace, and the Largest Failed Manhunt in U.S. History, the season examines the July 1997 assassination of legendary fashion designer Gianni Versace (Édgar Ramírez) by sociopathic spree killer Andrew Cunanan (Darren Criss).

The season also stars Ricky Martin as Antonio D'Amico and Penélope Cruz as Donatella Versace.

Impeachment (2021)

The Clinton–Lewinsky scandal served as the basis for the third season of the series, Impeachment, following the ensuing events during Clinton's presidency, based on Jeffrey Toobin's book A Vast Conspiracy: The Real Story of the Sex Scandal That Nearly Brought Down a President.

The season stars Sarah Paulson as Linda Tripp, Beanie Feldstein as Monica Lewinsky, Clive Owen as Bill Clinton, Margo Martindale as Lucianne Goldberg, Edie Falco as Hillary Clinton, and Annaleigh Ashford as Paula Jones. Originally slated to premiere in September 2020, the network pushed back the air date due to Murphy's schedule and later due to the ongoing COVID-19 pandemic. The network previously considered pushing back the air date due to the 2020 election. The season premiered on September 7, 2021.

Episodes

Season 1: The People v. O. J. Simpson (2016)

Season 2: The Assassination of Gianni Versace (2018)

Season 3: Impeachment (2021)

Production

Development

The People v. O. J. Simpson
On October 7, 2014, it was announced that FX had ordered a ten-episode season of American Crime Story developed by Scott Alexander and Larry Karaszewski and executive produced by Alexander, Karaszewski, Ryan Murphy, and Brad Falchuk, the latter two of whom cocreated such series as Nip/Tuck, Glee, American Horror Story, Scream Queens, and Pose. Murphy also directed the pilot episode. Other executive producers are Nina Jacobson and Brad Simpson. Co-executive producers are Anthony Hemingway and D. V. DeVincentis. All ten episodes were expected to be written by Alexander and Karaszewski. The series was previously in development at Fox but later moved to the company's sibling cable network FX.

Proposed Katrina seasons
A season titled Katrina was announced to be the series' second season, initially said to be using Douglas Brinkley's book The Great Deluge: Hurricane Katrina, New Orleans, and the Mississippi Gulf Coast as the primary source material, with Annette Bening cast as Kathleen Blanco, Matthew Broderick as Michael D. Brown, and Dennis Quaid as George W. Bush. However, it was later announced that the source material had changed to Sheri Fink's book Five Days at Memorial: Life and Death in a Storm-Ravaged Hospital, and the season would take an unflinching look at the decisions doctors made at Memorial Medical Center. Sarah Paulson was due to star as Dr. Anna Pou, who was on duty at the hospital when Katrina struck. Cuba Gooding Jr. and Courtney B. Vance were set to return after their participation in the first season, but after the source material was changed, only Paulson was set to star, with the other actors such as Bening, Broderick, and Quaid leaving the project. However, it was said the producers would try to find new characters for at least some of those actors already cast.

The so-called Katrina season was originally planned to be the second season of the series, with The Assassination of Gianni Versace following as the third. However, in June 2017, it was announced that Katrina would not begin production until early 2018 and that Versace would air in early 2018, replacing Katrina as the show's second installment. In early February 2019, John Landgraf acknowledged that the Katrina storyline was cancelled and won't be the subject of any season of the series.

The Assassination of Gianni Versace
The Assassination of Gianni Versace: American Crime Story was picked up on October 18, 2016, and was announced as the third season of the series, following the season about Katrina. The announcement also revealed that English author Tom Rob Smith would be the writer of multiple episodes of the season, including the first two, while executive producer Ryan Murphy would be directing the season premiere. Following the airing of the first season's finale in April 2016, it was revealed that series creators Scott Alexander and Larry Karaszewski would not be returning for the second season. However, in June 2017, it was announced that Katrina would not begin production until early 2018 and that Versace would air in early 2018, replacing Katrina as the show's second installment.

Impeachment
In January 2017, it was announced that a fourth season was in development, to air after Katrina. It was to cover the Clinton–Lewinsky scandal and the ensuing events during Clinton's presidency, based on Jeffrey Toobin's book A Vast Conspiracy: The Real Story of the Sex Scandal That Nearly Brought Down a President. However, in April 2018, Murphy revealed that the season was scrapped and no longer in development.

On August 6, 2019, it was announced that the Clinton–Lewinsky scandal season was back in development as the third season of the series and that it would be titled Impeachment. The season began production in October 2020, despite the original release date slated as September 27, 2020. Lewinsky herself signed on as a co-producer. Later that month, it was announced that the character of Hillary Clinton would appear in the series, but that she would not have a significant role.

Studio 54
On August 13, 2021, shortly before the premiere of season 3 Impeachment, it was announced that a potential fourth season, tentatively entitled Studio 54, was in development. This season would focus on the rise and fall of Steve Rubell and Ian Schrager and their Studio 54 nightclub during the 1970s leading up to Rubell and Schrager's eventual tax fraud conviction.

Casting

For season 1, Cuba Gooding Jr. and Sarah Paulson were the first to be cast as Simpson and Marcia Clark, respectively. Subsequently, David Schwimmer was cast as Robert Kardashian. In January 2015, it was reported that John Travolta had joined the cast as Robert Shapiro; he would also serve as producer. In February 2015, Courtney B. Vance joined the series as Johnnie Cochran. In March 2015, it was announced that Connie Britton would co-star as Faye Resnick. April 2015 saw the casting of Sterling K. Brown as Christopher Darden, Jordana Brewster as Denise Brown, and Kenneth Choi as Judge Lance Ito. In May 2015, it was confirmed Selma Blair would be portraying Kris Kardashian Jenner. In July 2015, it was announced Nathan Lane had joined the cast as F. Lee Bailey.

In February 2017, Annette Bening joined the cast of the ultimately unproduced Katrina as Kathleen Blanco, while Matthew Broderick was cast as Michael D. Brown. That same month, Édgar Ramírez and Darren Criss joined the cast of The Assassination of Gianni Versace as Gianni Versace and Andrew Cunanan, respectively. Initial reports announced that Lady Gaga would portray Donatella Versace in The Assassination of Gianni Versace, but Murphy confirmed that they were false. Penélope Cruz was later cast in the role. In April 2017, it was announced that Ricky Martin had joined the cast of The Assassination of Gianni Versace as Antonio D'Amico, Versace's longtime partner. On April 28, 2017, Annaleigh Ashford was seen filming on the set of The Assassination of Gianni Versace with Criss. On June 21, 2017, it was announced that Ashford's role in the series would be as Elizabeth Cote, a friend of Cunanan's since high school. On May 5, 2017, Murphy posted a photo on Instagram of Criss and Max Greenfield on the set of the season. On June 21, 2017, it was announced that Finn Wittrock would play Jeffrey Trail, Cunanan's first victim.

In February 2017, Ryan Murphy revealed that Sarah Paulson was to star in Impeachment, but not as Hillary Clinton. In August 2019, it was revealed that Sarah Paulson, Beanie Feldstein, and Annaleigh Ashford would star as Linda Tripp, Monica Lewinsky, and Paula Jones, respectively. On November 15, 2019, it was reported that Oscar-nominated actor Clive Owen will be playing the role of Bill Clinton along with Anthony Green set to portray Al Gore. In January 2020, it was announced that Billy Eichner would play the role of journalist Matt Drudge and Betty Gilpin would portray conservative media pundit Ann Coulter. In March 2021, it was announced that Edie Falco would play Hillary Clinton. In June 2021, Colin Hanks joined the cast. In August 2021, it was announced that Gilpin had exited the season due to scheduling conflicts and would be replaced by Cobie Smulders.

Filming
Principal photography for season one began on May 14, 2015, in Los Angeles, California. According to set photos, principal photography of Versace began at the beginning of May 2017, in Miami, Florida. Paulson revealed in an interview on Ellen that filming for season three is set to begin in Los Angeles, California. On November 13, 2020, Sarah Paulson confirmed the start of production.

Promotion
In October 2015, FX released its first promotional trailer for The People v. O. J. Simpson, showing an Akita dog whining, walking from its residence onto a sidewalk to bark, then walking back to its residence, leaving behind bloody paw prints. Later that month another teaser was released, wherein the first actual footage of Travolta as Shapiro was shown. In the teaser, Shapiro is about to ask Simpson (whose face is unseen) if he is responsible for the murder of Simpson's ex-wife. In the next short teaser that was released, Simpson (again unseen) is taking a lie detector test.

In November, two new teasers were released. The first shows Simpson writing his attempted suicide letter, while a voice-over by Gooding, Jr. narrates. The second shows the police chasing Simpson's white Ford Bronco, while dozens of fans cheer for him.

The first full trailer was released in December, along with a poster for the season. The trailer included Simpson sitting in the childhood bedroom of Kim Kardashian and contemplating suicide while Robert Kardashian tries to stop him.

In September 2017, FX released the first promotional teaser for The Assassination of Gianni Versace, showing doves sitting outside Versace's former mansion and flying away when two gunshots ring out. A second teaser was released that same month, depicting Versace's sister Donatella placing flowers on a casket.

Broadcast

The series first premiered worldwide in Canada on FX on February 2, 2016. In the Philippines, the series premiered on February 3, 2016, on CT. In India, the series premiered on STAR World Premiere HD and Hotstar on February 8, 2016. The first series premiered in the United Kingdom on February 15, 2016. The second series began on February 28, 2018, on BBC Two. In Israel, the series premiered on February 22, 2016. In Australia, the series' first season was promoted as a "miniseries" under the title The People vs OJ Simpson and premiered on Network Ten on March 6, 2016, before concluding on May 8, 2016. The series aired at 10:15 p.m. on Thursdays on RTÉ One in Ireland from October 2016.

The first 2 seasons were made available on Netflix worldwide excluding Canada and German-speaking Europe (Germany, Austria, Switzerland) in February 2017. However, on March 1, 2022, the show was pulled from Netflix globally, shifting to Hulu in united states the same month. It has also started to shift to Disney+ internationally and Star+ In Latin America.

Reception

Critical response
{{Television critical response
| series            = American Crime Story
| link1             = The People v. O. J. Simpson: American Crime Story#Critical response
| linkT1            = The People v. O. J. Simpson
| rotten_tomatoes1  = 97% (94 reviews)
| metacritic1       = 90 (45 reviews)

| link2             = The Assassination of Gianni Versace: American Crime Story#Critical response
| linkT2            = The Assassination of Gianni Versace
| rotten_tomatoes2  = 88% (98 reviews)
| metacritic2       = 74 (35 reviews)

| link3             = Impeachment: American Crime Story#Critical response
| linkT3            = Impeachment
| rotten_tomatoes3  = 69% (74 reviews)
| metacritic3       = 61 (34 reviews)

}}

The first season of American Crime Story has received critical acclaim. The review aggregator Rotten Tomatoes gave the season an approval rating of 97%, based on 94 reviews, with an average rating of 8.8/10. The site's critical consensus reads, "American Crime Story: The People v. O.J. Simpson brings top-shelf writing, directing, and acting to bear on a still-topical story while shedding further light on the facts – and provoking passionate responses along the way" On Metacritic, the season has a score of 90 out of 100, based on 45 critics, indicating "universal acclaim".

The second season of American Crime Story received positive reviews. The review aggregator Rotten Tomatoes gave the season an approval rating of 88%, based on 98 reviews, with an average rating of 7.2/10. The site's critical consensus reads, "The Assassination of Versace starts with a bang and unfurls slowly, moving backward through an intricate (and occasionally convoluted) murder mystery anchored by a career-defining performance from Darren Criss." On Metacritic, the season has a score of 74 out of 100, based on 35 critics, indicating "Generally favorable reviews".

The third season of American Crime Story received positive reviews. The review aggregator Rotten Tomatoes gave the season an approval rating of 69%, based on 74 reviews. The site's critical consensus reads, "Impeachment can't seem to decide whether it's unearthing the humanity of a presidential scandal or indulging the mythology of its media circus, but Beanie Feldstein and Sarah Paulson's performances ring true in the midst of all the noise." On Metacritic, the season has a score of 61 out of 100, based on 34 critics, indicating "Generally favorable reviews".

Ratings

Accolades 

Impeachment: American Crime Story was recognized with the ReFrame Stamp.

Notes

References

External links

 
 
 

 
2010s American anthology television series
2010s American crime drama television series
2010s American legal television series
2016 American television series debuts
2020s American anthology television series
2020s American crime drama television series
2020s American legal television series
American biographical series
American thriller television series
Best Miniseries or Television Movie Golden Globe winners
English-language television shows
FX Networks original programming
Primetime Emmy Award for Outstanding Miniseries winners
Primetime Emmy Award-winning television series
Serial drama television series
Television productions postponed due to the COVID-19 pandemic
Television series by 20th Century Fox Television
True crime television series